William Monson (ca. 1653 – 7 March 1727), of Broxbourne, Hertfordshire, was an English Whig politician who sat in the English House of Commons between 1695 and 1707 and in the British House of Commons between 1708 and 1722.

Monson was the second son of Sir John Monson KB, of Burton, Lincolnshire and his wife Judith Pelham, daughter of Sir Thomas Pelham, 2nd Baronet, of Halland, Laughton, Sussex.  He married Laetitia Poulett daughter of John Poulett, 3rd Baron Poulett on 18 July 1688.

 
Monson was elected Member of Parliament (MP) for Lincoln at the general election of 1695 and sat until 1698.  He was returned unopposed as MP for Heytesbury at the general elections of 1702 and 1705. He was elected as MP for Hertford in 1708 general election but was defeated there in 1710.  He was returned as MP for Aldborough at a by-election on 16 April 1715. He succeeded his brother Henry in the baronetcy  on 6 April 1718. He did not stand again at the 1722 general election.

Monson died without issue on 7 March 1727. His property and the baronetcy passed to his nephew, John Monson.

References

1653 births
1727 deaths
People from Broxbourne
Members of the Parliament of Great Britain for English constituencies
18th-century English people
English MPs 1695–1698
English MPs 1702–1705
English MPs 1705–1707
British MPs 1707–1708
British MPs 1708–1710
British MPs 1715–1722
Baronets in the Baronetage of England